The Solomon Islands competed at the 2016 Summer Olympics in Rio de Janeiro, Brazil, from 5 to 21 August 2016. This was the nation's ninth consecutive appearance at the Summer Olympics. The delegation included two track and field athletes – Rosefelo Siosi and Sharon Firisua – as well as weightlifter Jenly Tegu Wini. Wini was a returning competitor from the 2012 London Olympics and also led the delegation in those Games. The Solomon Islands, however, has yet to win its first Olympic medal.

Background 
The nation state of Solomon Islands comprises an archipelago of approximately a thousand islands that serves as home to almost 600,000 people. The islands were designated a protectorate of the United Kingdom in the 1890s, and remained under British control during World War II, where the archipelago was the centre of some of the war's worst fighting. In 1976, the British Solomon Islands Protectorate won the right to self-government, and declared independence in 1978 under the name Solomon Islands. The nation fell into a period of civil instability between then and 2003, when Australia led a multi-disciplinary mission, the Regional Assistance Mission to Solomon Islands (RAMSI) to restore law and order in the country.

The Solomon Islands participated in nine Summer Olympics between their debut in the 1984 Summer Olympics in Los Angeles, California, and the 2016 Summer Olympics in Rio de Janeiro, Brazil. The highest number of Solomon Islanders participating any single Summer Games was four at the 1988, 1996, and 2012 Summer Olympics. No Solomon Islander has ever won a medal at any Games. The Solomon Islands have never competed in the Winter Olympics. All Solomon Islanders participated through wildcard slots from the International Association of Athletics Federations and International Weightlifting Federation. Jenly Tegu Wini was chosen to be the nation's flagbearer during the parade of nations of the opening ceremony while Rosefelo Siosi bore it during the closing ceremony.

Athletics

The Solomon Islands have received universality slots from IAAF to send two athletes (one male and one female) to the Olympics.

Track & road events

Weightlifting

Jenly Tegu Wini participated on the Solomon Islands' behalf in the women's lightweight (58 kilogram) weightlifting competition. Wini qualified through an unused quota place from the  IWF to send a female weightlifter to the Olympics. Wini had participated in the previous 2012 Summer Olympics in the same category, finishing 17th. She had previously won three silver medals in the women 69kg weightlifting event of the 2009 Pacific Mini Games in Rarotonga, albeit the bronze medal was not awarded due to insufficient competitors. Her event took place on 9 March, and included 15 other athletes.

References

External links 
 

Olympics
Nations at the 2016 Summer Olympics
2016